La Paz was founded in 1548 by the Spanish conquistadors at the site of the Native American settlement Laja; the full name of the city was originally Nuestra Señora de La Paz (meaning Our Lady of Peace). The name commemorated the restoration of peace following the insurrection of Gonzalo Pizarro and fellow conquistadors four years earlier against Blasco Núñez Vela, the first viceroy of Peru. The city was later moved to its present location in the valley of Chuquiago Marka.

Control over the former Inca lands had been entrusted to Pedro de la Gasca by the Spanish king (and Holy Roman Emperor) Emperor Charles V. Gasca commanded Alonso de Mendoza to found a new city commemorating the end of the civil wars in Peru; the city of La Paz was founded on October 20, 1548.

In 1549, Juan Gutierrez Paniagua was commanded to design an urban plan that would designate sites for public areas, plazas, official buildings, and a cathedral. La Plaza de los Españoles, which is known today as the Plaza Murillo, was chosen as the location for government buildings as well as the Metropolitan Cathedral.

Spain controlled La Paz with a firm grip and the Spanish king had the last word in all matters political. In 1781, for a total of six months, a group of Aymara people laid siege to La Paz. Under the leadership of Tupac Katari, they destroyed churches and government property. Thirty years later, Indians laid a two-month siege on La Paz – where and when the legend of the Ekeko is set. In 1809, the struggle for independence from the Spanish rule brought uprisings against the royalist forces. It was on July 16, 1809 that Pedro Domingo Murillo famously said that the Bolivian revolution was igniting a lamp that nobody would be able to turn off. This formally marked the beginning of the Liberation of South America from Spain. Pedro Domingo Murillo was hanged at the Plaza de los Españoles that night, but his name would be eternally remembered in the name of the plaza, and he would be remembered as the voice of revolution across South America.

In 1825, after the decisive victory of the republicans at Ayacucho over the Spanish army in the course of the Spanish American wars of independence, the city's full name was changed to La Paz de Ayacucho (meaning The Peace of Ayacucho).

In 1898, La Paz was made the de facto seat of the national government, with Sucre remaining the nominal historical as well as judiciary capital. This change reflected the shift of the Bolivian economy away from the largely exhausted silver mines of Potosí to the exploitation of tin near Oruro, and resulting shifts in the distribution of economic and political power among various national elites.

History  of La Paz

References

 
Colonial Bolivia